The Unac is a sinking river in Bosnia and Herzegovina. It rises beneath Šator mountain, flows through the municipality of Drvar and finally meets Una River in Martin Brod. Also runs through two deep and rugged karstic canyons and it is dammed to form small Preodačko Lake and larger Župica Lake, before it reach town of Drvar.

Lower course of the Unac River and its canyon is included into the Una National Park.

See also
Sinking river

References

External links 

Rivers of Bosnia and Herzegovina
Sinking rivers of Bosnia and Herzegovina
Tourist attractions in Bosnia and Herzegovina
Protected areas of Bosnia and Herzegovina